2022 Mogadishu bombings may refer to: 

April 2022 Mogadishu bombing
August 2022 Mogadishu attack
October 2022 Mogadishu bombings
November 2022 Mogadishu attack